Hamre Township is a township in Beltrami County, Minnesota, United States. The population was 15 as of the 2000 census. A large share of the early settlers being natives of Hamre, Norway, caused the name to be selected.

Geography

Unincorporated towns
 Carmel at 
 Jelle at 
(This list is based on USGS data and may include former settlements.)

Major highway
  Minnesota State Highway 89

Adjacent townships
 Spruce Grove Township (north)
 Minnie Township (northeast)
 Steenerson Township (east)
 Lee Township (west)
 Benville Township (northwest)

Cemeteries
The township contains Our Saviours Cemetery.

Demographics
As of the census of 2000, there were 15 people, 9 households, and 3 families residing in the township. The population density was 0.4 people per square mile (0.2/km2). There were 20 housing units at an average density of 0.6/sq mi (0.2/km2). The racial makeup of the township was 100.00% White.

There were 9 households, out of which 22.2% had children under the age of 18 living with them, 33.3% were married couples living together, and 55.6% were non-families. 55.6% of all households were made up of individuals, and 22.2% had someone living alone who was 65 years of age or older. The average household size was 1.67 and the average family size was 2.50.

In the township the population was spread out, with 20.0% under the age of 18, 40.0% from 25 to 44, 13.3% from 45 to 64, and 26.7% who were 65 years of age or older. The median age was 44 years. For every 100 females, there were 200.0 males. For every 100 females age 18 and over, there were 140.0 males.

The median income for a household in the township was $16,875, and the median income for a family was $18,750. Males had a median income of $33,750 versus $16,250 for females. The per capita income for the township was $8,476. There were no families and 11.8% of the population living below the poverty line, including no under eighteens and 50.0% of those over 64.

References
 United States National Atlas
 United States Census Bureau 2007 TIGER/Line Shapefiles
 United States Board on Geographic Names (GNIS)

Townships in Beltrami County, Minnesota
Townships in Minnesota